Veneer is the debut studio album by Swedish singer-songwriter José González. It was released on 29 October 2003, in Sweden, 25 April 2005 in the rest of Europe and on 6 September 2005 in the United States.

Track listing

Singles
 "Heartbeats" (9 January 2006)
 b/w: "Suggestions"
 "Crosses" (10 April 2006)
 b/w: "Storm"

2 Disc Special Edition
 "Storm"
 "Love Will Tear Us Apart" (Joy Division)
 "Suggestions"
 "Down The Hillside"
 "Sensing Owls"
 "Hand On Your Heart" (Kylie Minogue)
 "Instrumental"

Personnel
 José González – vocals, guitars, percussion
 Stefan Sporsen – trumpet on "Broken Arrows"

Charts

Weekly charts

Year-end charts

Certifications

!scope="row"|Worldwide
|
|1,000,000
|-

References 

2003 debut albums
José González (singer) albums
European Border Breakers Award-winning albums